Emuella is a genus of trilobites of the family Emuellidae. Its fossils have been found in South Australia. It can be recognised by touching glabella and frontal border, and the sub-pentagonal head, as compared to, a short field between the front of the axis in the head or glabella and the border ridge, and a semi-circular headsheald in the sister-genus Balcoracania. Both emuellid genera share eye ridges that are positioned parallel to the frontal and lateral border of the head, prominent genal spines that are a smooth continuation of the lateral margin of the head, a prothorax of 6 segments, with the 5th and 6th merged and carrying large trailing spines. Both genera have in adulthood a highly variable but large number of segments of the opistothorax, although the largest number found in B. dailyi with 97 is much larger than in Emuella (52).

Etymology
The genus name means "little emu", and refers to Emu Bay, on Kangaroo Island, one of the sites where fossils of Emuella have been collected. The species epithet polymera is derived from Greek words πολύ -poly- meaning "many"; and μέρος -meros- meaning "part", for the many segmented thorax. E. dalgarnoi is named after R.C. Dalgarno, who discovered Balcoracania dailyi in the Flinders Ranges, near Blinman, South Australia.

References

Further information

 
 
 
 
 

Cambrian trilobites
Emuelloidea
Trilobites of Oceania
Redlichiida genera
Fossil taxa described in 1970
Emu Bay Shale

Cambrian genus extinctions